Ibrahim Al-Mukhaini may refer to:

 Ibrahim Al-Mukhaini (footballer, born 1987), Omani football defender for Sur
 Ibrahim Al-Mukhaini (footballer, born 1997), Omani football goalkeeper for Al-Nasr